Dinev is a Bulgarian masculine surname, its feminine counterpart is Dineva. It may refer to
Dimitré Dinev (born 1968), Bulgarian-born Austrian writer
Ivan Dinev (born 1978), Bulgarian figure skater
Nikola Dinev (1953–2019), Bulgarian Olympic wrestler
Zhivko Dinev (born 1987), Bulgarian football player 

Bulgarian-language surnames